Melampsora occidentalis is a plant pathogen. It is a macrocyclic, heteroecious rust that alternates between poplars and conifers.

References

External links
 Melampsora occidentalis

Fungal plant pathogens and diseases
Pucciniales
Fungi described in 1917